Larisa Savchenko and Natasha Zvereva won in the final 6–4, 6–1 against Leila Meskhi and Svetlana Parkhomenko.

Seeds
Champion seeds are indicated in bold text while text in italics indicates the round in which those seeds were eliminated. The top four seeded teams received byes into the second round.

Draw

Final

Top half

Bottom half

References
 1988 Dow Chemical Classic Doubles Draw

Birmingham Classic (tennis)
1988 WTA Tour